Serbs in Italy or Italian Serbs are a community numbering 46,958.

History
According to Graziadio Isaia Ascoli, the 19th century writer Giovanni de Rubertis considered the Schiavoni (Slavs) or Dalmati (Dalmatians) of Molise in Italy to be Serbs that were brought there by Skanderbeg during his Italian expedition in 1460–1462, along with Albanians.

In 1497, Italian court poet Rogeri de Pacienza di Nardo wrote about a group of Serbian refugees who left the Despotate of Đurađ Branković to settle in the village of Gioia del Colle near Bari, Italy. He describes how they sang and danced the kolo in honour of the Queen of Naples, Isabella del Balzo. The names of the singers that Pacienza wrote down are common Serbian names.

In 1782, the first Serbian school opened in Trieste, and in the 19th century the Serbian Orthodox Saint Spyridon Church in Trieste was built near the Ponte Rosso square.

Demographics
Some 40,000 Serbs live in northern Italy. In Arzignano, there are thousands of Serbs from all over former Yugoslavia.  As of the 2013 Italian census,  "foreign citizens" from Serbia (excluding Kosovo) live in Italy.

As of 2012, some 10,000–15,000 Serbs live in the city of Trieste.

Triestine Serbs

Triestine Serbs are the ethnic Serbs of Trieste, present in the city since the 18th century.

History
In 1719, Charles IV declared Trieste a free port, to serve as the empire's outlet to the world. Charles' daughter Maria Theresa went further by slashing duties, improving the harbor, pulling down old city walls, and encouraging Illyrian (Serb), Greek, and Jewish merchants to expand the port. Later, to make it easier to unload ocean vessels, she ordered the dredging of Trieste's , a waterway reaching into the city itself. Serb merchants and ship-owners established a community in Trieste at the start of the 18th century, most primarily originating from Sarajevo, Trebinje, and the Bay of Kotor.

In 1751, Maria Theresa of the Austro-Hungarian Empire proclaimed religious freedom in the city, and the Serbs and Greeks of Trieste built the Saint Spyridon Church that same year. In 1766, Trieste's Serbs numbered 50; by 1780, the number had grown to 200.

Austria's long rule was interrupted briefly by the French, who invaded twice, occupying the area about 13 years. After the Napoleonic Wars, Austrian citizens went back to work to make the port city more significant than ever. The port handled an increasing trade in the Russian, Levantine, African, and Oriental markets.

The opening of the Suez Canal in 1869 proved to be a bonanza, putting Trieste in closer touch with Asia. With the advent of railroads, there was direct contact with Vienna, and countries to the east and west, making Trieste a great South European hub.

Serbian School
In 1782, the Serbian community of Trieste began expressing its desire for a Serbian-language day school, a place for their children to be passed down Serbian culture and language. Jovan Miletic, a wealthy Serb merchant in Trieste, donated 24,000 florins to build a Serbian elementary school in 1787. On 1 July 1792, the local government approved its opening, and the Jovan Miletić Private School began official operation, located in the city center, right beside the Saint Spyridon Church. A night school and reading room were opened in 1911. In 1911, an asylum was added to the school, for Serbian political refugees, due to the constant warfare and bloodshed occurring between the Austro-Hungarian and Ottoman empires on the Balkan Peninsula. The school represented a pillar of the Serbian community of Trieste, where the children of the wealthy Serbian merchants went to school and integrated into the city's community. In 1973, the school was shut down due to lack of student enrollment and became a Sunday school for Serbian language and culture. Velimir Djerasimović, the school's principal and teacher since 1927, retired in 1973. Djerasimović is the father of Italian film actors Ivan Rassimov and Rada Rassimov and poet Milorad Djerasimović.

Saint Spyridon Church

In 1782, the Serbian Orthodox and Greek Orthodox communities of Trieste split due to major disagreements concerning church rituals and language-usage, at which point the Greek community built its own Greek Orthodox Church of San Nicolò dei Greci in the neoclassical style, and the Serbs continued to use the original church of Saint Spyridon. But in 1861, the Serb community demolished the original church, and rebuilt a new, much more grandiose one in its stead, in Serbo-Byzantine Revival style, in order to "stamp their identity architecturally in the midst of a baroque Austro-Italian city".  The church's construction was completed seven years later, in 1868. With the added capacity for 1,600 worshippers, it was for a long time the second-largest Serbian church in the world. The church is filled with liturgical masterpieces of the time—including works in gold from the 17th and 18th centuries, and antique Orthodox icons and handmade books—making it an important monument to Serbian history and culture. The church was designed by Italian architect Carlo Maciachini, and features four cupolas and one large main dome colored a muted blue. In the 1800s, the Serbian population in Trieste numbered around 200 people.

Under Fascist rule
In 1918, at the end of World War I, Trieste became part of Italy and social life drastically changed for the Serbs and other minorities of Trieste. Due to the contentious national border with Slovenia, Italian society became increasingly hostile towards all Slavs in Trieste including the Serbs, and anti-Slavic racism began to flourish in Italy. The anti-Slavic feelings in Trieste were present already before the war, embodied by the local Liberal-National Party, led by Giuseppe Cuzzi, whose aim was to make Trieste completely Catholic and Italian. The anti-Slavic propaganda focused on the idea that Slavic people were barbaric and could not integrate properly into a civilized society. Tensions came to a head in World War II, when the Germans, who had occupied northern Italy in September 1943, built the only Nazi extermination camp in Italy, Risiera di San Sabba, on the outskirts of Trieste. Three thousand Jews, Serbs, and other Slavs were executed here in 1944, while thousands more were imprisoned awaiting transfer to other extermination camps.

Monuments

Besides the Saint Spyridon Church and the Jovan Miletić Serbian School, the Serbs of Trieste contributed to several other important landmarks of the city. Cristoforo Popovich owned many famous merchant ships in Trieste, some of the largest in the Adriatic—the Tartana, Il Feroce Dalmata, La Forza, and the Ripatriato—and was instrumental in the Russian-side during the Crimean War (1853–1856). Cristoforo Scuglievich (Risto Skuljevic) built the Palazzo Scuglievich in the mid-1800s along the banks of the city, and donated the palace in his will to the Serbian community of Trieste; today it is owned by the Serb community. In addition to this, in the city center there are also the palaces of Serb merchants, such as the Palazzo Vucetich, Palazzo Popovich, Palazzo Kurtovich, and Casa Ivanovich.

Serbian writers
The Serbian community of Trieste has had a deep and long-lasting relationship with Serbian writers from the 18th century to today. Iconic Serbian writers and linguists such as Vuk Karadžić, Dositej Obradović, Petar II Petrović-Njegoš, Zaharije Orfelin, and Pavle Solarić were inspired by Trieste and its developed Serbian community. They wrote many works on Trieste's influence on Serbian "pre-Romanticism" and cultural development during a time when the Serbs lacked statehood and cultural expression.

Serbian linguist and creator of the standardized Serbian language, Vuk Karadžić, kept in constant contact with Trieste's Serb community from his home in Vienna. In 1813, Vuk called upon the Triestan Serbs to subscribe to the Serbian-language newspaper, Novine Serbske, which promoted the newly-standardized Serbian language, and more than sixty copies of the standard Serbian dictionary were bought in 1814. Lukijan Mušicki wrote an ode to Serbian merchants of Trieste in 1835, and revolutionary writer Dositej Obradović tutored the children of the wealthy Serb merchants. Many Serbian poets and folklorists  even worked in the Saint Spyridon Church for a time. An almost universal feeling of inspiration and admiration of Trieste's wealthy Serb community was shared by their Balkan-Serb contemporaries.

Modern day 
Today, Serbian-born Serbs represent the largest foreign-born community in Trieste, numbering around 10,000, although some figures state anywhere up to 18,000. The overwhelming majority of Serbs in Trieste today descend from the immigration wave following the Yugoslav Wars of the 1990s. Recently, the Serbian Orthodox Society in Trieste, led by Bogoljub Stojičević, has called on the local government to grant the Serb Community of Trieste cultural autonomy and reinstate the Jovan Miletic Serbian School as a full-time school since its downgrading to a Sunday school due to inactivity in 1973. Since 2009, the Serbian community of Trieste, namely the Serbian Association "Vuk Karadžić", has been organizing an annual Balkan-style trumpet festival on the outskirts of Trieste called "Guca na Krasu" (Guca in Karst), modeled after the famous Guča Trumpet Festival in Serbia. Since its beginnings, the festival has managed to gain recognition and popularity, succeeding in getting famous musicians like Goran Bregović and Boban Marković, as well as many popular Italian acts. The oldest active Serbian organization in Trieste is the soccer club "Serbia Sport", started in 1992, and which since then has won a multitude of championships in the local Trieste soccer league, making it today one of the top soccer teams in the Province of Trieste. Together with the Serbian Association "Vuk Karadžić", Serbia Sport organizes an annual Serbian-Diaspora Soccer Tournament in Trieste on the Serbian holiday Spasovdan, which occurs 40 days after Easter.

Organizations
There are several community organizations of Serbs in Italy. The Association of Serbs of Italy was established in April 2015 by the combined organizations meeting in Trieste.

Notable people

Nobility
 Elena of Montenegro, Queen consort of Italy
 Princess Yolanda of Savoy
 Darinka Kvekić, wife of Danilo I, Prince of Montenegro
 Natalija Konstantinović, wife of Prince Mirko of Montenegro
 Carlo III Tocco
 Maria of Serbia, Marchioness of Montferrat
 William IX, Marquess of Montferrat

Military
 Giuseppe Viscovich

Artists
Marcello Dudovich, one of the most acclaimed commercial artists of art, prints, and posters during his time
Milan Zloković, an architect born in Trieste

Writers
Ljudevit Vuličević, writer
Dositej Obradović, philosopher and linguist
Aleksa Šantić, poet
Cristoforo Ivanovich, librettist 
Stefano Zannowich, writer and adventurer
Tomo Medin, writer and adventurer
Giovanni de Rubertis, poet
 Niccolò Tommaseo

Printers
Božidar Vuković
Vićenco Vuković

Businesspeople
Spiridione Gopcevich, a shipowner from Trieste
Jovo Kurtović, a shipowner from Trieste
 Mihajlo Vučetić, a grain merchant, shipowner, and shareholder in Austrian Lloyd from Trieste
Singers
Sara Jovanović (born 1993), Serbian singer born in Rome that represented Serbia at Eurovision Song Contest 2013 (as part of a group Moje 3)

Doctors
Dimitrije Frušić
George Nikolic (Giorgio Nicolich)
 Marino Gopcevich

Teachers
Dositej Obradović
Miljko Radonjić

Scientists
 Spiridon Gopčević

TV and cinema
Nina Seničar (born 1985), model and actress, lives in Italy since 2006
Sasha Montenegro (born 1945), actress born in Bari as Aleksandra Acimović Popović
Ivan Rassimov (1938–2003), late actor born in Trieste to Serbian parents as Ivan Djerasimović; brother of Rada Rassimov 
Rada Rassimov (born 1941), actress born in Trieste to Serbian parents as Rada Djerasimović; sister of Ivan Rassimov
Olga Bisera, actress born Bisera Vukotić
Milena Vukotic (born 1935), actress and ballerina

Sportspeople
Giovanni Raicevich was a famous Italian wrestler in the early 20th century. 
Miloš Malivojević (born 1993), active footballer born in Scandiano, Reggio Emilia 
Marino Nicolich (born 1910), late footballer born in Monfalcone, whose name was Italianized in "Marino Nicoli" by the Italian Fascist government
Dragan Travica (born 1986), volleyball player born in Croatia, son of the Serbian coach Ljubomir Travica; plays for the Italian national team 
Ljubomir Travica (born 1954), volleyball coach and retired player; has residence in Italy since he played for Modena in 1983. He is the father of Dragan Travica.
Marko Stanojevic (born 1979), rugby union player born in Birmingham to a Serbian father and an Italian mother. He played for the Italian national team.

See also
Serbian diaspora
Serbs

References

External links
 Svetionik (Srbi u Italiji) - Northern Italy's Serbian community website 
  Historical documents on the Serbs of Italy
 

Italy
Italian people of Serbian descent
Italy
Italy
Italy
Serbian Orthodox Church in Italy
Ethnic groups in Italy